Chris Banks (born 1970) is a Canadian poet.

Life

Banks' childhood was spent in the small Ontario towns of Stayner, Sioux Lookout, and Bancroft. He received a Bachelor of Arts from the University of Guelph, before moving on to complete a Masters of Arts in Creative Writing from Concordia University and later a Bachelor of Education from the University of Western Ontario. Banks later began teaching at Bluevale Collegiate Institute in Waterloo, Ontario.

Works/Books
Banks' works include a chapbook, Form Letters (2002). His first full-length collection, Bonfires, was awarded the Jack Chalmers Award for poetry by the Canadian Authors' Association in 2004. Bonfires was also a finalist for the Gerald Lampert Award for best first book of poetry in Canada.  His most recent collection of poems Deepfake Serenade was published by Nightwood Editions in the fall of 2021. He lives in Kitchener, Ontario, where he writes, and teaches at Bluevale Collegiate Institute.

Awards and recognition
 2004: Canadian Authors Association, winner of poetry award, Bonfires
 2004: Finalist for Gerald Lampert Award for poetry, Bonfires
 2006: Gowlings Literary Award

Bibliography
2002: "Form Letters", Junction Books  (chapbook)
2003: "Bonfires", Nightwood Editions
2006: "Sparrows and Arrows", Bilbioasis (chapbook)
2006: "The Cold Panes of Surfaces", Nightwood Editions
2011: "Winter Cranes", ECW Press
2015: "Invaders", Anstruther Press, (chapbook)
2017: "The Cloud Versus Grand Unification Theory", ECW Press
2019: "MidLife Action Figure", ECW Press
2021: "Shadow Forecast", Floodlight Editions (chapbook)
2021: "Deep Fake Serenade", Nightwood Editions

See also

Canadian literature
Canadian poetry
List of Canadian poets
List of Canadian writers

References

External links
Nightwood Editions
ECW Press
Review of Winter Cranes in Quill & Quire
Chris Banks Poetry

1970 births
21st-century Canadian poets
Living people
People from Sioux Lookout
Writers from Ontario
University of Western Ontario alumni
University of Guelph alumni
Concordia University alumni
Canadian male poets
21st-century Canadian male writers
People from Clearview, Ontario